WWE Rivals is a 2022 American documentary television series. The series premiered on A&E on July 10, 2022.

Plot
The series is a round table discussion featuring WWE Legends and Superstars examining the most iconic rivalries in WWE.

Series overview

Episode list

Season 1 (2022)

Season 2 (2023)

References

External links
 

2020s American documentary television series
2022 American television series debuts
English-language television shows
A&E (TV network) original programming
Professional wrestling documentaries
Television series by WWE